Lynn Island is an uninhabited island of the Greenland Sea, Greenland.

History
The island was surveyed and named by the Danmark Expedition to the North-East Coast of Greenland 1906–1908. Expedition member Christian B. Thostrup recorded that it was named after a British shipping company based at Bridgeness.

Geography
Lynn Island is a coastal island located west of the southward bend of the Dijmphna Sound with the Hekla Sound on its northern and western shore. It lies to the west of much larger Hovgaard Island and to the south of the Holm Land Peninsula.

See also
List of islands of Greenland

References

Uninhabited islands of Greenland

it:Lynn Ø
sv:Lynn Ø